Zone 56 is a zone of the municipality of Al Rayyan in the state of Qatar. The main districts recorded in the 2015 population census were Fereej Al Asiri, New Fereej Al Khulaifat, Bu Samra, Al Mamoura, Abu Hamour, Mesaimeer, and Ain Khaled. 

Other districts which fall within its administrative boundaries are Labour City and Umm Al Seneem.

Demographics

Land use
The Ministry of Municipality and Environment (MME) breaks down land use in the zone as follows.

References 

Zones of Qatar
Al Rayyan